The Weitzman National Museum of American Jewish History (The Weitzman) is a Smithsonian-affiliated museum at 101 South Independence Mall East (S. 5th Street) at Market Street in Center City Philadelphia.  It was founded in 1976.

History

With its founding in 1976, the then– museum shared a building with the Congregation Mikveh Israel.

In 2005, it was announced that the museum would be moved to a new building to be built at Fifth Street and Market Street on the Independence Mall. The site was originally owned by CBS' KYW radio and KYW-TV. The project broke ground on September 30, 2007. The  glass and terra-cotta building was designed by James Polshek and includes an atrium, a  area for exhibits, a Center for Jewish Education, and a theater. The structural engineer was Leslie E. Robertson Associates.

The project, including endowment, cost $150 million. The opening ceremony was held November 14, 2010 and was attended by over 1,000 people, including Vice President Joe Biden, Mayor Michael Nutter, Governor Ed Rendell, and Rabbi Irving Greenberg. The building opened to the public November 26, 2010.

In 2012, Ivy Barsky was appointed as the CEO of the museum and she served until 2019. During her tenure the George Washington 1790 letter was given on permanent loan.

In March 2020, the museum closed as a result of the COVID-19 pandemic and staff wages were reduced. In May the museum furloughed two thirds of its staff without pay. The acting CEO was Misha Galperin who had taken over when Barsby resigned the year before. The staff were not entitled to some benefits because of the museum being in chapter 19 protection.

In March 2020, The National Museum of American Jewish History filed for Chapter 11 bankruptcy protection, seeking relief from debt incurred by the construction of its Independence Mall home. The museum's debts included over $30 million to bondholders, and an additional $500,000 to unsecured creditors; at the time of the bankruptcy filing, the museum was paying 20% of its annual budget in interest payments. The filing followed several years of decreasing attendance, revenue, and fundraising. The museum's operations were not affected by the bankruptcy. The museum exited bankruptcy in September 2021 after several creditors forgave $14 million in debt and board member Mitchell Morgan purchased the museum building for $10 million.

In August 2020, following the signing ceremony for the Great American Outdoors Act in which President Donald Trump mispronounced the name of Yosemite National Park as "yo-semites", the museum's online gift shop experienced a surge in sales for a pre-existing, similarly phrased "Yo Semite" T-shirt. Sales of the shirt, which brought in $30,000 in the three days following Trump's statement and led to continued sales thereafter, provided unexpected international publicity and required financial assistance to the museum.

In November of 2021, it was announced that the museum would be renamed in honor of a generous contribution from Stuart Weitzman. The museum is now known as The Weitzman National Museum of American Jewish History.

Exhibitions
Exhibits use pieces from the museum's collection which includes over 30,000 objects and ranges from the Colonial period to the present day. Exhibits have focused on the lives and experiences of Jews in America, with past exhibitions centering on Ruth Bader Ginsburg and Leonard Bernstein. Professor Jonathan Sarna of Brandeis University led the development of the core exhibit for the museum.

To Bigotry No Sanction: George Washington and Religious Freedom

In 2012, The Weitzman (then NMAJH) held a special exhibition that featured one of the most important documents pertaining to religious freedom in the United States. The letter was written in 1790 to the Hebrew Congregation in Newport, Rhode Island, addressing the new country's religious freedom. George Washington's letter expressed the new government's commitment for religious freedom and equality for all faiths. The exhibition included numerous artifacts as well as early printings of the Declaration of Independence and the Constitution.

Hall of Fame and Gallery
Established in 2010, the National Museum of American Jewish History Hall of Fame and a related permanent exhibition gallery honors the lives of prominent Jewish Americans. The initial class of eighteen inductees was chosen both by a public vote and a panel of historians and experts. Inductees were elected in one of eight categories. In its opening year, the exhibit contained a film about the inductees’ lives and artifacts, including Sandy Koufax’s baseball mitt and sheet music from Irving Berlin. The exhibition was renamed the Ed Snider 'Only in America' Gallery and Hall of Fame in honor of the former chairman of Comcast Spectacor.

From the Core Exhibition in 2010

See also
National Museum of American Jewish Military History

References

External links

Ethnic museums in Pennsylvania
History museums in Pennsylvania
Jewish-American history
Jewish history organizations
Jewish museums in the United States
Jews and Judaism in Philadelphia
Museums established in 1976
Museums in Philadelphia
1976 establishments in Pennsylvania
Old City, Philadelphia